Cauer is a German surname.

This surname is shared by the following people:

 Ludwig Cauer (1866–1947), German sculptor
 Minna Cauer (1841–1922), German educator, journalist and radical activist within the middle-class women's movement
 Wilhelm Cauer (1900–1945), German mathematician and scientist

See also 
 Kauer

German-language surnames